Crack o' Dawn is an extant 1925 silent action adventure film directed by Albert S. Rogell and starring Reed Howes.

Cast
Reed Howes - Earle Thorpe Jr.
J. P. McGowan - Earle Thorpe Sr.
Ruth Dwyer - Earl Thompson
Henry A. Barrows - Henry Thompson
Eddie Barry - Toby Timkins
Tom O'Brien - Stanley Steele
Ethan Laidlaw - Red Riley

Preservation status
A print is held by George Eastman House Motion Picture Collection.

References

External links

posters:..#1,..#2

1925 films
American silent feature films
Films directed by Albert S. Rogell
American black-and-white films
Rayart Pictures films
American auto racing films
American action adventure films
1920s action adventure films
Films with screenplays by John Grey
1920s American films
Silent action adventure films
1920s English-language films